Ana Mercedes Galarza Añazco (born September 23, 1989, in Ambato, Tungurahua, Ecuador is a beauty pageant titleholder who was first runner-up in Miss Ecuador 2010.

Miss Ecuador 2010 
Galarza is a student of Psychology in the Pontificia Universidad Cátolica del Ecuador. She is also the first woman from Tungurahua to be crowned Miss World Ecuador.  Miss Ecuador 2010 was broadcast live from CEMEXPO, in Quito.

Miss World 2010 
As the first runner-up of the Miss Ecuador 2010 beauty pageant, Galarza represented Ecuador in the Miss World 2010 pageant. She placed among the Top 20 in the Miss World Talent fast-track competition.

External links
Miss Ecuador Organization

References 

1989 births
Living people
People from Ambato, Ecuador
Ecuadorian beauty pageant winners
Miss World 2010 delegates